The Illinois Green Party is a statewide political party in Illinois. The party is state affiliate of the Green Party of the United States. Its stated mission and purpose are to advance the Ten Key Values of the Green Party in Illinois through political means and to support individual members and the formation of Green Party locals.

In 2006, the party ran its first statewide candidates led by Rich Whitney, candidate for Illinois Governor, who received 361,336 votes for 10% of the total vote, making the Green Party one of only three legally established, statewide political parties in Illinois, in addition to the Democratic and Republican parties until it lost that status in 2010.

There are currently 12 local chapters affiliated with the party, as well as ten members holding elected office in the state.

The Ten Key Values
Key values of the Green Party platform include the following:

Ecological wisdom
Social justice
Grassroots democracy
Nonviolence
Decentralization
Community-based economics
Feminism
Respect for diversity
Personal and global responsibility
Future focus

2008 Elections
At the 2007 Green National Meeting the Illinois Green Party submitted a Proposal to host the 2008 Green Party National Convention. Green Party National Convention 2008 - Chicago, Illinois Greens from four cities had submitted proposals for the 2008 convention but in the end The National Committee chose Chicago.

As an established party it was entitled to a presidential primary, if at least two candidates qualify for that primary.

In 2007, Illinois law required all candidates in the presidential primary to submit 3,000 signatures by November. On November 5, 2007 the deadline for candidate petitions to run in the Green presidential primary, four Greens filed Cynthia McKinney, Kent Mesplay, Jared Ball and Howie Hawkins. (Hawkins was believed to be a stand-in for Ralph Nader). Only eight state affiliates of the Green Party held presidential primaries in 2008 (other states nominated by caucus or convention).

In 2008, 32 Green Party candidates filed petitions to run in the Illinois Green Party primary by the filing deadline. The party also had the power to fill ballot vacancies in races where nobody is picked in the Feb. 5 primary.  Following the primary and state party convention the party has fielded sixty candidates for the November general election.

2010 Elections
In 2010, Rich Whitney again ran for Governor of Illinois, hoping to improve on his 2006 result. LeAlan Jones, a journalist and activist from Chicago's South Side, ran for Senate. Both were uncontested in the June primary. Both Whitney and Jones were excluded from televised debates, despite the Green Party's Major Party Status. Whitney and Jones filed a lawsuit against Public Broadcasting Station member WTTW for excluding them. A private vendor of ballots misspelled Rich Whitney's name as Rich 'Whitey' in 23 Chicago wards, about half of which were in predominantly African-American neighborhoods. There is no evidence this was intentional.

Jones polled as high as 14% in a June 2010 poll, but ended up with 3.18% of the vote. In August 2010, Whitney polled 11% in a Public Policy Polling survey. However, he ended with just 2.70% of the overall vote. Because neither candidate garnered over 5% of the vote statewide, the Illinois Green Party lost Major Party Status.

2014 Elections

Scott Summers ran for governor and Sheldon Schafer ran for secretary of state as write-in candidates after being knocked off the statewide slate.

2016 Elections 
In 2016, the Green Party ran Scott Summers for U.S. Senate and Tim Curtin for Illinois Comptroller.

Dr. Jill Stein was the party's nominee for President.

2020 Elections  
In 2020, Howie Hawkins won the nomination over Dario Hunter. In the general election Howie Hawkins received 30,494 votes, which is less than 1% of the vote.

See also
Illinois gubernatorial election, 2006
2006 Election for statewide offices in the State of Illinois
2020 United States presidential election in Illinois
Government of Illinois

References

External links
Illinois Green Party (Official site)
ILGP on Facebook
ILGP MySpace page

Green
Illinois